FC Háje Jižní Město is a Czech football club located in Prague-Háje. It currently plays in the Prague Championship, which is in the fifth tier of the Czech football system.

References

External links
 Official website 
 FC Háje Jižní Město at the website of the Prague Football Association 

Football clubs in the Czech Republic
Football clubs in Prague
Association football clubs established in 1930